Stanley J. McCutcheon (September 1917 — May 22, 1975) was an American politician and lawyer from Anchorage, Alaska who served several nonconsecutive terms in the Alaska House of Representatives, representing the 3rd legislative district of Alaska as a Democrat in the 16th, 17th, 19th, 20th, and 22nd territorial legislatures. He served as Speaker of the House from 1949 to 1951.

Early life and education
McCutcheon was born in Anchorage, Alaska in September of 1917. He attended both high school and law school in Anchorage.

Career
McCutcheon served a total of five terms in the Alaska House of Representatives, representing the 3rd legislative district of Alaska as a Democrat. He served from 1943 to 1947 in the 16th and 17th territorial legislatures, from 1949 to 1953 in the 19th and 20th territorial legislatures, and from 1955 to 1957 in the 22nd territorial legislature.

McCutcheon served as Speaker of the Alaska House of Representatives from 1949 to 1951 in the 19th territorial legislature.

Outside of the Alaska Legislature, McCutcheon was a lawyer with his own private law practice in Anchorage. He also served as president of Alaska Airlines.

Personal life and death
McCutcheon was married and had two children.

McCutcheon died at the age of 57 in Anchorage on May 22, 1975.

References

1917 births
1975 deaths
20th-century American politicians
Speakers of the Alaska House of Representatives
Democratic Party members of the Alaska House of Representatives
Politicians from Anchorage, Alaska
Date of birth missing